The 1870 Columbia football team represented Columbia University in the 1870 college football season. They finished with a 0–1 record.

Schedule

References

Columbia
Columbia Lions football seasons
College football winless seasons
Columbia football